...When the Angels Make Contact is the third album by Matt Mays, released in 2006.

Track listing

All songs written by Matt Mays, except as noted.

Film

This album was originally planned to be the soundtrack for a film of the same name, directed by Matt Mays and Drew Lightfoot. Although Mays has said the filming is complete, funding ran out before production was completed and the project has been indefinitely shelved.
Sam Roberts and Buck 65 are featured in the movie, (Buck 65 plays the character on the album cover)
The movie trailer, music video and live performance are on the When The Angels Make Contact web page.

References

External links
 Official When The Angels Make Contact Website
 Official Matt Mays Website

2006 albums
Matt Mays albums